The Sir William Sutherland Cup, more commonly known simply as the Sutherland Cup, is a trophy in the sport of shinty.  It is the national cup competition for junior sides, the equivalent of the Camanachd Cup for those sides in lower league competition. The current (2022) holders are Newtonmore.

History
The trophy was donated by Sir William Sutherland M.P.  in order to allow "junior" (i.e. small clubs) the opportunity for national competition  and was first played for in 1923 with Newtonmore defeating North Bute 3-2.  Sir William had previously donated another cup of the same name for competition.

The trophy is at present known officially as the Highland Industrial Supplies Sir William Sutherland Cup due to a sponsorship deal with Highland Industrial Supplies.

In 2011, the final was held in Aberdeen for the first time to mark the 150th anniversary of Aberdeen University Shinty Club.

The 2017 final was postponed due to heavy rain in Fort William in late july, and was to be replayed on September 16 between Lochside Rovers and Kingussie.

2023 marks the 100th Anniversary of the 1st Sutherland Cup Final and will take place at Blairbeg Park, Drumnadrochit.

2012 Controversy

In 2012, Newtonmore won the cup with a 5-4 victory over Kingussie. However, More were stripped of the title due to having played an ineligible player, Callum Stewart, in both the final win and the semi-final victory over Glenurquhart.

Winners
2022 Newtonmore 3 - 2 Lovat at Blairbeg Park, Drumnadrochit
2021 Newtonmore 5 - 1 Lovat at Blairbeg Park, Drumnadrochit
2020 No competition owing to COVID-19
2019 Lochside Rovers 2 - 1 Lovat at Canal Parks, Caol
2018 Newtonmore 5 - 2 Kingussie at The Dell, Kingussie
2017 Lochside Rovers 3 - 1 Kingussie at An Aird, Fort William
2016 Newtonmore 6 - 0 Kingussie at Kingussie
2015 Newtonmore 5 - 0 Lochside Rovers at Ballachulish
2014 Kyles Athletic 4 - 2 Fort William, at Newtonmore (a.e.t.)
2013 Ballachulish 3 – 1 Lochcarron at Farr (a.e.t.) 
2012 Kingussie 2 – 0 Glenurquhart at Beauly 
2011 Kingussie 6 – 1 Kyles Athletic at Aberdeen 
2010 Lovat 4 – 1 Glenurquhart at Newtonmore 
2009 Fort William 3 – 1 Lovat at Inverness 
2008 Kilmallie 2 – 1 Fort William at Kingussie 
2007 Kilmallie 1 – 0 Fort William at Oban 
2006 Fort William 6 – 0 Glenorchy at Beauly 
2005 Aberdeen University 3 – 1 Kilmallie at Portree 
2004 Kilmallie 4 – 0 Inveraray at Ballachulish 
2003 Newtonmore 3 – 0 Boleskine at Kingussie 
2002 Kilmallie 2 – 1 Kingussie at Newtonmore 
2001 Kincraig 3 – 2 Aberdeen University at Newtonmore 
2000 Lovat 2 – 2 Lochside Rovers at (Lovat won 2 – 0 on penalties) 
1999 Newtonmore 3 – 2 Kingussie at Newtonmore 
1998 Kyles Athletic 2 – 1 Newtonmore at Fort William 
1997 Lochside Rovers 2 – 1 Glengarry at Newtonmore 
1996 Kingussie 6 – 1 Kilmallie at Fort William 
1995 Fort William 1 – 0 Kilmallie at Spean Bridge 
1994 Aberdeen University 4 – 2 Newtonmore at Newtonmore 
1993 Newtonmore 3 – 1 Kingussie at Newtonmore (after 1st match abandoned at 0 – 0 at Inveraray
1992 Kingussie 5 – 3 Glasgow Mid Argyll at Spean Bridge 
1991 Kingussie 13 – 1 Inveraray at Inveraray 
1990 Kingussie 4 – 0 Lochside Rovers at Inverness 
1989 Kingussie 6 - 1 Lochside Rovers at Taynuilt 
1988 Skye 7 – 2 Strachur at Strathpeffer 
1987 Kyles Athletic 7 – 5 Glenurquhart (aet) at Taynuilt 
1986 Kingussie 5 – 0 Strachur at Fort William 
1985 Skye 2 – 1 Strachur at Inveraray 
1984 Fort William 1 – 0 Bute at Spean Bridge 
1983 Lochaber 6 – 1 Col Glen at Taynuilt 
1982 Glenorchy 2 – 1 Lochaber at Fort William 
1981 Skye 3 – 1 Glasgow University at Oban 
1980 Kyles Athletic 4 – 3 Kingussie at Oban 
1979 Skye 3 – 2 Kyles Athletic at Fort William 
1978 Fort William 6 – 3 Oban Celtic at Inveraray 
1977 Kinlochshiel 9 – 1 Glenorchy at Fort William 
1976 Kingussie 3 – 1 Lochaber at Newtonmore 
1975 Kyles Athletic 6 – 3 Newtonmore at Oban 
1974 Aberdeen University 6 – 4 Oban Celtic at Kingussie 
1973 Aberdeen University 6 – 2 Bute at Oban 
1972 Bute 2 – 1 Aberdeen University at Spean Bridge 
1971 Ballachulish 2 – 0 Skye at Inverness 
1970 Lochcarron 4 – 2 Ballachulish at Spean Bridge 
1969 Inveraray 5 – 1 Ballachulish at Dalmally 
1968 Lochcarron 2 – 1 Ballachulish at Inverness 
1967 Lochcarron 4 – 2 Inveraray at Fort William 
1966 Boleskine 4 – 2 Kyles Athletic at Fort William 
1965 Lochaber 3 – 1 Ballachulish at Fort William 
1964 Boleskine 4 – 0 Kyles Athletic at Strachur 
1963 Glenurquhart 3 – 2 Kyles Athletic at Spean Bridge 
1962 Kinlochshiel 5 – 4 Kyles Athletic at Fort William 
1961 Kyles Athletic 6 – 1 Newtonmore at Oban 
1960 Lochside Rovers 2 – 1 Glenurquhart at SpeanBridge 
1959 Newtonmore 7 – 5 Inveraray at Oban 
1958 Kilmallie 4 – 2 Skye at Beauly (after 3 – 3 draw) 
1957 Beauly 3 – 2 Kilmallie at Spean Bridge 
1956 Beauly 1 – 0 Lochside Rovers at Spean Bridge 
1955 Lochcarron 1 – 0 Strachur at Fort William 
1954 Beauly 4 – 2 Appin at Fort William 
1953 Newtonmore 3 – 1 Dunstaffnage at Fort William 
1952 Beauly 5 – 2 Col Glen at Oban 
1951 Spean Bridge 4 – 3 Straths Athletic at Corpach 
1950 Portree 5 – 4 Newtonmore at Beauly 
1949 Ballachulish 3 – 2 Lochcarron at Inverness 
1948 Kilmallie 7 – 1 Straths Athletic at Fort Augustus 
1947 Oban Celtic 4 – 3 Newtonmore at Fort William (after 1 – 1 draw) 
1940 /46 No Competition due to Second World War 
1939 Lochcarron 5 – 4 Kilmallie at Newtonmore 
1938 Newtonmore 6 – 2 Kyles Athletic at Fort William 
1937 Lochside Rovers 1 – 0 Newtonmore at Keppoch 
1936 Lochside Rovers 5 – 1 Nether Lochaber at Oban 
1935 Kyles Athletic 5 – 2 Caberfeidh at Keppoch 
1934 Nether Lochaber 5 – 2 Strachur at Oban 
1933 Lochside Rovers 3 – 1 Strathconon at Keppoch 
1932 Kyles athletic 4 – 1 Newtonmore at Oban 
1931 Kyles Athletic 3 – 1 Kingussie at Keppoch 
1930 Strathconon 2 – 1 Colintraive and Glendaruel at Kingussie 
1929 Lochside Rovers 4 – 3 Strathglass at Spean Bridge 
1928 Newtonmore 4 – 0 Colintraive and Glendaruel at Oban 
1927 Newtonmore 4 – 0 Kyles Athletic at Oban 
1926 Furnace 4 – 3 Caberfeidh at Newtonmore 
1925 Lochside Rovers 2 – 0 Newtonmore at Keppoch 
1924 Kyles Athletic 3 – 2 Newtonmore at Oban 
1923 Newtonmore 3 - 2 North Bute at Keppoch

Wins by Club

References

External links
Results

Recurring sporting events established in 1923
1923 in Scotland
Shinty competitions